Utada: In The Flesh 2010 was Japanese–American singer-songwriter Utada's first international tour. The 10-date sold out tour began in Honolulu and ended in London, with the London date reportedly selling out in as little as five hours, to which another date was added. The show received its name from the "Dirty Desire" lyric, "And you can't wait to see me / To see me in the flesh".

Background and synopsis 

In an interview before starting the tour, Utada stated that since demand had been so high, she would definitely go on tour (having previously speculated whether or not a tour was something she should have done). She also said she wanted the shows to be "stripped down", choosing small venues on purpose, and to give the show a more "warm" and "intimate" feel.
In all of the venues, the stage was set with a banner depicting "Utada: In The Flesh 2010", with two screens either side of the stage, which would show the album artwork to the current song playing. The band that Utada performed with for the 2006 show, Utada United 2006 also played during In The Flesh (which is also her first tour since Utada United 2006).

DJ Mike Rizzo played numerous songs before the shows started, playing for around 1 hour before Utada begun.

Utada originally only planned to perform in London on February 12, but the 800 tickets sold out within five hours, and the ticket company accidentally sold almost twice as many, thus resulting in fans receiving email that their ticket was not valid. Following this, Utada decided to add a second date in London, the 11th. Those who received the email were made a priority for this date and given a ticket should they have wished to take it.

Recordings and release 
The NYC and London shows were filmed and were in discussion by Teruzane Utada for a possible iTunes or other digitally-available release immediately after the tour. Although the release ran into problems (namely the fact that half of the concert's track list was released under the Island Def Jam label, with the other half being released under EMI Japan [there was speculation that Def Jam would not allow the release due to Utada's contract with the label having ended]), Utada's official Twitter account mentioned that these problems were being resolved.

This then lead to a wait of three years, with little to no communication from Utada or her management about the release. Teruzane arose hopes again on January 31, 2011. Just after Utada's Wild Life tour, Teruzane resorted to Twitter to confirm that a video release for the In The Flesh tour was forthcoming, along with Wild Life. In addition, Teruzane mentioned his intent to have both shows released on video by Spring 2011.

However, Wild Life was released, with no comment from Teruzane about In The Flesh. It wasn't until two years later the topic was once again brought up, after a question by a Twitter user about the likelihood of a release, Teruzane apologised and stated that a release was "99% realistic".

On December 9, 2013, after almost three years since the show's first date, Utada: In the Flesh 2010 was released on iTunes Japan. On July 29, 2014, Utada: In the Flesh 2010 was released on the UK iTunes store, with the intention of releasing it to other markets soon after, namely the US, Mexico and Canada.

At the Honolulu and Boston shows, Utada performed an impromptu performance of Boku wa Kuma, as an audience request.

Shows

References

2010 concert tours
Hikaru Utada concert tours
Concert tours of the United States
Concert tours of the United Kingdom
January 2010 events in the United States
February 2010 events in the United States
January 2010 events in the United Kingdom
February 2010 events in the United Kingdom